Anachis delamarrei is a species of sea snail in the family Columbellidae, the dove snails.

References

 Rolán E. & Boyer F. 2006. A new Anachis (Gastropoda: Columbellidae) from Gabon. Novapex 7(1): 25–27.
 Monsecour, K. (2010). Checklist of Columbellidae. pers. comm.

delamarrei
Gastropods described in 2006